Sebastián Garrocq  (born ) is an Argentine male volleyball player. He was part of the Argentina men's national volleyball team at the 2014 FIVB Volleyball Men's World Championship in Poland. He played with UPCN San Juan.

Clubs
 UPCN San Juan (2014)

References

1979 births
Living people
Argentine men's volleyball players
Place of birth missing (living people)